Liopycnas is a genus of moths belonging to the family Tineidae. It contains only one species, Liopycnas percnombra, which is found in Japan.

References

Myrmecozelinae
Monotypic moth genera
Moths of Japan